Mark Da Silva Lindström (born 22 January 1996) is a Swedish footballer who plays as a defender for Pittsburgh Riverhounds in the USL Championship.

Career

Youth, College and Amateur
Lindström played at various levels with the youth teams at Gefle IF, before opting to play college soccer at the University of North Carolina Wilmington in the United States in 2016. During his time with the Seahawks, Lindström made 68 appearances and scored 2 goals, as well as being named CAA All-Rookie Team in his freshman year.

Whilst at college, Lindström also played in the USL League Two for OKC Energy U23, Cincinnati Dutch Lions and Brazos Valley Cavalry.

Professional
On 16 January 2020, Lindström signed with USL Championship side Pittsburgh Riverhounds. He made his professional debut on 15 August 2020, appearing as a 73rd-minute substitute during a 1–0 loss to Indy Eleven.

References

External links
 Profile at UNCW Athletics
 Profile at Pittsburgh Riverhounds

1996 births
Living people
Swedish footballers
Swedish expatriate footballers
Expatriate soccer players in the United States
Association football defenders
Gefle IF players
UNC Wilmington Seahawks men's soccer players
Cincinnati Dutch Lions players
Brazos Valley Cavalry FC players
Pittsburgh Riverhounds SC players
USL League Two players
USL Championship players
People from Gävle
Swedish expatriate sportspeople in the United States
Sportspeople from Gävleborg County